The 1992 NHL Supplemental Draft was the seventh NHL Supplemental Draft. It was held on June 19, 1992. The supplemental draft was shortened to a single round in 1992 and limited to the six teams that missed the 1992 Stanley Cup playoffs and the expansion Ottawa Senators and Tampa Bay Lightning.

Selections

See also
1992 NHL Entry Draft
1992 NHL Expansion Draft
1992–93 NHL season
List of NHL players

References

External links
 1992 NHL Supplemental Draft player stats at The Internet Hockey Database

National Hockey League Supplemental Drafts
Supplemental Draft